The Grand Experiment is the first album by the progressive rock supergroup The Neal Morse Band. The album was composed and recorded over a short period of time, with no preparation work before entering the studio. This is the first time Morse has recorded this way, with no pre-prepared material (and as a completely collaborative effort with his new band), hence the album's title. It was released on February 10, 2015, in three formats: single CD edition, a special edition which includes the album plus a bonus CD and DVD, and a double CD and vinyl edition. A music video for the title track was released on January 7, 2015.

Track listing

Personnel
 Neal Morse - lead vocals, keyboards, guitars
 Mike Portnoy - drums, backing vocals
 Randy George - bass, backing vocals
 Eric Gillette - guitars, lead & backing vocals
 Bill Hubauer - keyboards, lead & backing vocals

Technical personnel
 Rich Mouser - mixing

Critical reception
Stereoboard named The Grand Experiment album of the year in 2015.

References

2015 albums
Neal Morse albums